Erigeron parishii is a species of flowering plant in the family Asteraceae known by the common name Parish's fleabane.

Distribution
Erigeron parishii is native to San Bernardino County and Riverside County in southern California. It is a federally-listed threatened species losing habitat to development and the limestone mining industry on the north slope of the San Bernardino Mountains.

Description

The erect stems have inflorescences of one to ten flower heads, each between one and two centimeters (0.4-0.8 inches) wide. The flower head has a center of golden yellow disc florets and a fringe of up to 55 lavender, pink, or white ray florets.

Ecology
Erigeron parishii usually grows on limestone substrates, or granite topped with a layer of limestone. It apparently requires very alkaline soils.

Conservation
The same rock that the plant favors is also sought after for human use and limestone mining is the most significant threat to its habitat.

Erigeron parishii has a relatively high genetic diversity for a narrow endemic, a measure that will decrease with the habitat fragmentation that currently threatens it.

References

External links
Jepson Manual Treatment — Erigeron parishii
United States Department of Agriculture Plants Profile: Erigeron parishii
US Fish & Wildlife Service, Conserving the Nature of America, Local Rare Plants (1997)
Erigeron parishii — Calphotos Photo gallery, University of California

parishii
Endemic flora of California
~
Natural history of the California chaparral and woodlands
Natural history of the Transverse Ranges
Natural history of San Bernardino County, California
Plants described in 1884
Threatened flora of California